Allan Kyambadde (born 15 January 1996) is a Ugandan professional footballer, who plays as a midfielder for El Gouna in the Egyptian Premier League.

Club career
In August 2019, Kyambadde joined Egyptian Premier League side El Gouna FC from Kampala Capital City Authority FC.

International career
In January 2014, coach Milutin Sedrojevic, invited Kyambadde to be a part of the Uganda national team squad for the 2014 African Nations Championship. The team placed third in the group stage of the competition after beating Burkina Faso, drawing with Zimbabwe and losing to Morocco.

Career statistics

Scores and results list Uganda's goal tally first, score column indicates score after each Kyambadde goal.

References

1996 births
Living people
Ugandan footballers
Association football midfielders
Uganda international footballers
Vipers SC players
Express FC players
SC Villa players
Kampala Capital City Authority FC players
El Gouna FC players
Uganda A' international footballers
2014 African Nations Championship players
2019 Africa Cup of Nations players
Ugandan expatriate footballers
Ugandan expatriate sportspeople in Egypt
Expatriate footballers in Egypt
Sportspeople from Kampala
2018 African Nations Championship players